Eun-ji, also spelled Eun-jee, is a Korean feminine given name. The meaning differs based on the hanja used to write each syllable of the name. There are 30 hanja with the reading "eun" and 61 hanja with the reading "ji" on the South Korean government's official list of hanja which may be used in given names. Eun-ji was the third-most popular name for baby girls born in South Korea in 1990.

People
People with this name include:

Sportspeople
Lee Eun-ji (born 1989), South Korean track cyclist
Lim Eun-ji (born 1989), South Korean pole vaulter
Gim Un-chi (born 1993), South Korean curler

Entertainers
Kim Eun-ji (born 1979), stage name MayBee, South Korean singer
Jo Eun-ji (born 1981), South Korean actress
Park Eun-ji (television personality) (born 1983), South Korean television personality
Jeong Eun-ji (born Jung Hye-rim, 1993), South Korean singer and actress, member of girl group Apink

Other
Park Eun-ji (politician) (1979–2014), South Korean politician

See also
List of Korean given names

References

Korean feminine given names